Rafael Delgado (August 20, 1853 - May 20, 1914) was a Mexican author. In 1896, he became a member of the Academia Mexicana de la Lengua, occupying the 12th (XII) chair.

Biography

Source:

Works
Mi vida en Soledad (1879)
Antes de la boda monólogo (1899)
La calandria novela (1890)
Angelina novela (1893)
Los parientes ricos cuentos y notas (1901)
Historia vulgar novela corta (1904)
Lecciones de literatura (1904)
Lecciones de geografía histórica (1910)
Sonetos publicación póstuma (1940)
Mi única mentira...
 Himno a Nicolás Bravo

References

External links
 
 

1853 births
1914 deaths
Mexican male writers
Writers from Veracruz